Lędyczek Drugi  is a settlement in the administrative district of Gmina Czarne, within Człuchów County, Pomeranian Voivodeship, in northern Poland.

For details of the history of the region, see History of Pomerania.

The settlement has a population of 6.

References

Villages in Człuchów County